A toll station may refer to:
 A toll house or toll booth on a turnpike or toll highway
 In historical landline telephony, a non-dialable toll point as a manual telephone in an isolated rural location with no local exchange or local calling area

See also 
 Tollbooth (disambiguation)